The Republican Left (SR) was a social-liberal political party in Italy.

In January 1994 Giorgio La Malfa returned to the leadership of the Italian Republican Party (PRI), replacing Giorgio Bogi, and the party's national council decided to leave Democratic Alliance (AD) – of which the PRI had been a founding member – and to enter the Pact for Italy coalition. Therefore Bogi, Giuseppe Ayala, Libero Gualtieri and others left the PRI and launched the "Republican Left", which continued to be part of AD and joined the larger Alliance of Progressives.

In February 1998 the SR was merged, along with the Labour Federation, the Social Christians, the Unitarian Communists, the Reformists for Europe and the Democratic Federation, into the Democratic Party of the Left (PDS), thus founding the Democrats of the Left (DS). After that, the SR became an internal faction within the DS.

References

Defunct political parties in Italy
Defunct liberal political parties
Political party factions in Italy
Political parties established in 1994
1994 establishments in Italy
Political parties disestablished in 1998
1998 disestablishments in Italy
Liberal parties in Italy
Radical parties in Italy
Republican parties
Social liberal parties